Aspergillus igneus (also known as Neosartorya aurata) is a species of fungus in the genus Aspergillus. It is from the Fumigati section. The species was first described in 1989. It has been reported to produce helvolic acid.

Growth and morphology

A. igneus has been cultivated on both Czapek yeast extract agar (CYA) plates and Malt Extract Agar Oxoid® (MEAOX) plates. The growth morphology of the colonies can be seen in the pictures below.

References 

igneus
Fungi described in 1989